Akhmednabi Gvarzatilov is a Russian and Azerbaijani freestyle wrestler. He won one of the bronze medals in the men's freestyle 61 kg event at the 2016 World Wrestling Championships held in Budapest, Hungary.

In 2020, he won the silver medal in the men's 61 kg event at the Individual Wrestling World Cup held in Belgrade, Serbia.

Achievements

References

External links 
 

Living people
Place of birth missing (living people)
Azerbaijani male sport wrestlers
World Wrestling Championships medalists
1993 births